Enyalius bilineatus, the two-lined fathead anole, is a species of lizard in the family Leiosauridae. It is native to Brazil.

References

Enyalius
Reptiles described in 1837
Reptiles of Brazil
Taxa named by André Marie Constant Duméril
Taxa named by Gabriel Bibron